Nördlingen railway station is a Deutsche Bahn railway station in Nördlingen, Bavaria, Germany.

History 

During the construction of the Ludwig South-North Railway (Ludwig-Süd-Nord-Bahn), a station was also planned in Nördlingen, with the intention of facilitating a connection to the Württemberg railway network. The Aalen–Nördlingen section, however, was built by the Royal Württemberg State Railways. It was opened in 1863, connecting Württemberg to the Bavarian railway network. However, a separate terminal station was built in Nördlingen for the Württemberg line.

The Bavarian Railway Museum (BEM) is now housed in the former Nördlingen engine depot (Betriebswerk). It is also the base of the BayernBahn Betriebsgesellschaft mbH (BayernBahn, Bavarian Railway Operations Company), a private train operating company that operates freight traffic on the lines in the area.

There are two signal boxes (for dispatching and for controlling access to sidings); these are mechanical interlocking of the Jüdel class and was built in 1929. The station still has semaphore signals.

Train operations 

DB Regio Bayern operated Regionalbahn services as the Fugger-Express until December 2022, using  Alstom Coradia Continental (class 440) electric multiple units. Since then, this line has been operated as part of the Augsburger Netze under Go-Ahead Bayern. The lines to Feuchtwangen and Gunzenhausen are only operated by passenger trains in the summer (otherwise they are exclusively used by freight). These are operated with diesel and steam locomotives.

References

External links 
  Bavarian Railway Museum 
 Museumsbahnen des BEM
 Eisenbahn Wörnitz-Franken
 Information about the signal boxes in Nördlingen

Railway stations in Bavaria
Railway stations in Germany opened in 1866
1866 establishments in Bavaria
Buildings and structures in Donau-Ries
Nördlingen